Berger is a surname.

Berger may also refer to:

Places
Berger, Missouri

Other uses 

Berger's disease, or IgA-Nephropathie (IgAN), a form of the Glomeruloneph
Roland Berger Strategy Consultants, European strategy consultancy firm
Berger Cookies, made by DeBaufre Bakeries in Baltimore, MD
Berger (grape), another name for the California/French wine grape Burger
Alternative name of German Shepherd dog, which is commonly used in France and Vietnam (pronounced the French way).